Arleen Schloss (born December 12, 1943 in Brooklyn, New York) is a North American performance artist, video/film artist, sound poet, director and curator of the lower Manhattan art, video, performance art and music scenes. Schloss began through A's – an interdisciplinary loft space that became a hub for music, exhibitions, performance art, films and videos.  In the 1990s A's became A's Wave where website works and other forms of digital media were shown.

Concurrently with A's, Schloss established herself as a curator, co-organizing shows at Danceteria and The Storefront of Art and Architecture, now an architectural venue in New York.

Schloss operated as a performance artist in the 1970s. The New York Times stated that her performances were "superior to much performance art." and the SoHo Weekly News noted that her voice was "musical the way Patti Smith or Yoko Ono are musical."

Life and work 
Schloss studied at the Bank Street College of Education, the Art Students League of New York, and Parsons School of Design and graduated from New York University.

In subsequent years she performed her media opera "A.E.BLA BLA BLA" at Ars Electronica in Austria and was a featured guest on Willoughby Sharp's Downtown '86, which showcased 1980s performers, artists and musicians.

Additionally, during the 1980s, she began to get noticed for her sound poetry work, mostly for the audio piece "How She Sees It By Her."  Schloss' sound work is included in two publications and anthologies, "Just Another Asshole," a short-lived no wave art/music/sound art magazine publication published by Glenn Branca and Barbara Ess and "Text-Sound Texts" Edited by Richard Kostelanetz.

Schloss was awarded an 8mm camera from Canon to experiment with 8mm video. With the camera, she created the travelogue video Sun Daze Away, which showed at Central Park's Summerstage and at various venues in Europe and Asia.  In 1990 Schloss directed and produced the video documentary "FromKepler2Cyberspace", with Hi8 equipment loans from Sony. This document featured the pioneers of virtual reality, including Dr. Marvin Minsky, John Perry Barlow, Timothy Leary, William Gibson and Jaron Lanier.  During the same period, Schloss filmed a series of interviews with John Cage and included those interviews in a series entitled "Windows of Chance/Change."  Nickelodeon, because of her video work and art in dealing with the alphabet and children, hired Schloss in 1989 to direct and produce 15 live video excerpts for the animated TV series Eureeka's Castle, which won a Cable ACE Award.

In the 1990s Schloss continued her work with new forms of art and media.  She exhibited her electronic work "Marbelize" at the international digital and technology show at ISEA, in Rotterdam, the Netherlands and showed multimedia work on the digital art, radio and Internet program ArtNetWeb. Art Dirt In-Port Performance 3/25/1997

Schloss received grants, awards and residencies from The Experimental Television Center, Creative Artists Public Service Grant, New York Foundation of the Arts, Harvestworks, Allied Productions  and the Ford Foundation.  She is on the board of Art & Sciences Collaborations Inc, and her work is in the collections of the Fales Library, AT&T, the Aldrich Museum of Contemporary Art and the Donnell Library.
The New York Underground Museum documents her entire work.    A documentary about Arleen's life, called Wednesdays at A's, is currently in post production.   Schloss lives in New York City.

Exhibitions, screenings, films and performances 
 "Feet" Interactive Installation,  Soho, NYC 1970
 "Fore" Director 16 mm experimental film 1970
 "Words & Music" with musician Jack Smead  Bykert Gallery  New York 1975
 "SNAP - the making of an Elastic composition" Betty Parsons Gallery New York 1976
 "It's A" live performance Robert Freidus Gallery New York 1976 (also 1977 and 1978)
 "A Shot Chance" live performance The Kitchen, New York 1977
 "Its A at MoMa" live Performance, Museum of Modern Art New York 1978
 "How She Sees It" Audio Work Sound Performance, 1979
 "A Shot Chance" Lenbachhaus, Städtische Gallery Munich 1980
 "How She Sees It" (Film Version), Director/Writer/Editor, 1983
 "A. E. Bla Bla Bla" - 24 Hour Media Opera - Ars Electronica Festival, Linz, Austria 1986
 "Glenn Branca Symphony No. 4/Physics" Director/Writer/Editor Videonale, 1984
 "Sun Daze Away" Director/Editor/Writer Central Park Summer Stage, 1989
 "Art Around the Park", Tompkins Square Park, NYC 1992
 "From Kepler 2 Cyberspace: The Pioneers of Virtual Reality," New York 1993
 "Arleen Schloss Retrospective" Städtische Galerie im Butentor Bremen, Germany 1994
 "Nine Dragon Heads", Nature Electronic 2nd International Environmental Festival, Chung Buck, Korea 1997
 "Strange Birds," Group exhibition at Center for Book Arts, NY 2012
 "Arleen Schloss: an evening of Super 8 Film and Hi8 Video," New Museum, 2012
 "Come Closer:  Art Around the Bowery," 1969 - 1989, Group exhibition at New Museum, 2012
 "Windows of Chance/Change," (Featuring John Cage)  New York No Limits Film Series at the White Box Art Center, NY 2012
 "Art in Flux/Speaking in Tongues," Group Exhibition, New York 2012-2013
 “Coded After Lovelace,” Group Exhibition, White Box Art Center, NY 2014
 “The Printed Room, Works Off Paper” Group Exhibition  SALTS Gallery, Switzerland, 2016
 "Archival Showcase" Hauser & Wirth Institute, 2019

Collections
 The Aldrich Contemporary Art Museum, Ridgefield Connecticut, 1970/72
 Lenbachhaus, Munich, West Germany, 1981
 Museum of Modern Art Library, New York City, 1982

Awards
 Multi-Media, Soho Tech Award, A's Salon Series, 1980
 ACE Award, The Universe of A, on the making of performance opera, 1987
 ACE Award Manhattan Cable Television, Eureeka's Castle Nickelodeon TV, 1989

References

Further reading
 Goodbye 20th Century: Die Geschichte von Sonic Youth, Arleen Schloss S. 514 ff, Verlag: Kiepenheuer & Witsch; Auflage: 1., Auflage (24. August 2009)

External links 
 “Wednesday's At A's,” A Fascinating Window Into Arleen Schloss' Avant-Garde World
 "Wednesdays at A's" - Documentary about Arleen Schloss
 How Do You Like the Bowery?
 Bowery Artist Tribute
 Guide to A's Events Collection 1979-1987
 25 years Ars Electronica, Linz, Austria
 Arleen Schloss: Four Performances (1979-82), video by Werner Schmiedel

1943 births
21st-century American women artists
American art curators
American conceptual artists
American multimedia artists
American performance artists
American video artists
American women curators
Artists from New York (state)
Living people
Musicians from Brooklyn
Steinhardt School of Culture, Education, and Human Development alumni
Women conceptual artists